Edwin Rodríguez Morales (born August 14, 1960) is a minor league manager for the Acereros de Monclova of the Mexican League. He is the former manager of the Florida Marlins of Major League Baseball's National League.  He also played Major League Baseball briefly in the early 1980s as an infielder.

Playing career
He played his first professional season with their Rookie league Gulf Coast Yankees in 1980. He played three seasons for the New York Yankees and San Diego Padres.

Post-playing career
The same year that his playing career was over (1989 in the Puerto Rican Winter League) he became a full-time scout for the Minnesota Twins. He scouted for the Twins from 1989 to 1996. While working as a Scout he earned his BBA (1993) at the Pontifical Catholic University of Puerto Rico with an Accounting degree.

Rodríguez spent two seasons (2007–08) as the manager of the Class A Greensboro Grasshoppers in the South Atlantic League. He had a 66–72 record with the Hoppers in 2008 and was 71–69 in 2007. He previously spent two seasons as manager of the Florida Marlins' Gulf Coast League affiliate from 2005–06 and served as hitting coach for the Double-A Carolina Mudcats in 2004. Before joining the Marlins organization, he was manager of the Princeton Devil Rays of the Class A (Short-Season) Appalachian League from 2000–02, and was skipper for the Hudson Valley Renegades of the New York–Penn League in 1999. In 1997 he joined the Tampa Bay Devil Rays as their hitting coach for the GCL Rookie club. Rodriguez was named the manager of the Triple-A New Orleans Zephyrs on December 30, 2008, becoming the 11th manager in the team's history.

On June 23, 2010, Rodríguez became the interim manager for the Florida Marlins replacing Fredi González and won his first game against the Baltimore Orioles on the same day. On June 29, before a Marlins game in San Juan, Puerto Rico, Marlins owner Jeffrey Loria announced that Rodríguez would remain as manager through the 2010 season. He resigned as manager on June 19, 2011. The team was 32–39 and in last place in the NL East when he resigned.

On November 29, 2012, Rodríguez became the manager for the Double-A Akron Aeros. During 2013.

On January 27, 2017, Rodríguez became the manager for the Class A (Advanced) Lake Elsinore Storm.

Rodríguez currently serves as executive director of the Puerto Rico Baseball Academy and High School in Gurabo, Puerto Rico.

See also
 List of Major League Baseball players from Puerto Rico

References

External links

1960 births
Living people
Sportspeople from Ponce, Puerto Rico
Columbus Clippers players
Florida Marlins managers
Greensboro Hornets players
Gulf Coast Yankees players
Las Vegas Stars (baseball) players
Major League Baseball infielders
Major League Baseball players from Puerto Rico
Minnesota Twins scouts
Nashville Sounds players
New York Yankees players
Oneonta Yankees players
Pontifical Catholic University of Puerto Rico alumni
Portland Beavers players
San Diego Padres players
World Baseball Classic managers
Minor league baseball managers